Maheswar Baro is a Bodoland People's Front politician from Assam. He was elected in Assam Legislative Assembly election in 2016 from Kalaigaon constituency.

References

Living people
Bodoland People's Front politicians
People from Udalguri district
Assam MLAs 2016–2021
Year of birth missing (living people)